Thomas Clarges (c. 1618–1695) was an English politician.

Thomas Clarges may also refer to:

Sir Thomas Clarges, 2nd Baronet (1688–1759), MP for Lostwithiel
Thomas Clarges (c. 1721–1753), of the Clarges baronets
Sir Thomas Clarges, 3rd Baronet (1751–1782), MP for Lincoln
Sir Thomas Clarges, 4th Baronet (c. 1780–1834)

See also
Clarges (disambiguation)